Louis Schreuder (born 25 April 1990) is a South African rugby union player who plays as a scrum-half for  Bath in Premiership Rugby.

Club career

Super Rugby caps arrived the following year as he took advantage of injuries to regular scrum-halves Dewaldt Duvenage and Ricky Januarie to earn valuable game time towards the end of the season. Januarie's departure ahead of the 2012 season saw Schreuder become the regular back-up to Duvenage and he made 14 substitute appearances during the campaign. More game time arrived in the 2012 Currie Cup and he earned his first piece of senior rugby silverware as a 68th-minute substitute for Nic Groom as Western Province upset the  25–18 in Durban to land their 33rd Currie Cup title.

2013 saw Schreuder take his game to a new level and with Dewaldt Duvenage announcing he would join French Top 14 side Perpignan at the conclusion of the 2013 Super Rugby season he saw much more action.   He started 6 games and made 4 substitute appearances as himself, Duvenage and Groom were all rotated throughout the campaign. However, come the 2013 Currie Cup he appeared to have established himself ahead of Nic Groom as Province's first-choice scrum-half.   He played in all 12 of his side's matches during the season, including 9 starts as the Western Cape outfit reached their 2nd consecutive Currie Cup Final.   Schreuder was named in the starting line-up and was substituted in the 52nd minute as the Shark's gained revenge on Western Province with a surprise 33–19 victory at Newlands.

Schreuder signed for French giants Toulon in the Top 14 as a medical joker during the 2019 Rugby World Cup. Afterwards, Schreuder travels to England to join Newcastle Falcons in the Premiership Rugby from the 2020-21 season.

International career

Schreuder was vice-captain of the South Africa Under 20 team that competed in the 2010 IRB Junior World Championship in Argentina.

An injury crisis during the 2013 Incoming test series meant he received a call-up for the national team, the Springboks on 11 June 2013. Once more Schreuder was unable to earn a slot in the matchday squad but gained valuable experience training alongside fellow scrum-halves Fourie du Preez, Ruan Pienaar and Jano Vermaak.

Super Rugby Statistics

References

External links
 

Living people
1990 births
South African rugby union players
Stormers players
Western Province (rugby union) players
Rugby union scrum-halves
Sportspeople from Paarl
Afrikaner people
Alumni of Paarl Gimnasium
South Africa Under-20 international rugby union players
Kubota Spears Funabashi Tokyo Bay players
South African expatriate rugby union players
Expatriate rugby union players in Japan
South African expatriate sportspeople in Japan
Southern Kings players
South Africa international rugby union players
Sharks (Currie Cup) players
Sharks (rugby union) players
RC Toulonnais players
Newcastle Falcons players
Rugby union players from the Western Cape